

The Piper PA-6 Sky Sedan was a 1940s American four-seat light aircraft designed and built in prototype form by Piper Aircraft at its Lock Haven, Pennsylvania, factory.

History
Towards the end of 1944 Piper announced a number of aircraft types it intended to build after World War II. One of these was the PWA-6 Sky Sedan (Post War Airplane 6). A prototype was built in 1945 as a development of Piper's unsuccessful two-seat PT-1 trainer. Its fuselage had a fabric-covered metal frame with a four-seat cabin. It was a low-wing cantilever monoplane with a conventional tail unit and a retractable tailwheel landing gear. Originally to be powered by a 140 hp Franklin engine, it had a 165 hp Continental E-165 engine. By the time it first flew the designation had been changed to PA-6. A second aircraft was built in 1947, it differed by having an all-metal construction, a 205 hp Continental E-185 engine and a one-piece windscreen. Neither version was placed into production at a time when a short boom in postwar general aviation was ending.

Specifications (PA-6)

See also

References

Notes

Bibliography
  
 Roger W. Peperell and Colin M.Smith, Piper Aircraft and their forerunners, 1987, Air-Britain (Historians), Page 47 and 50.

1940s United States civil utility aircraft
PA-06
Single-engined tractor aircraft
Abandoned civil aircraft projects of the United States
Low-wing aircraft
Aircraft first flown in 1944